Kjersti Tysse Plätzer (born Tysse; 18 January 1972) is a Norwegian race walker, who won the silver medal at the 2000 Summer Olympics in Sydney, in the 20 kilometres race. She finished 12th in the same race in the 2004 Olympic Games in Athens and 4th in the 2007 World Championships in Osaka. At the 2008 Summer Olympics in Beijing, she again won a silver medal in the 20 kilometres race.

Born in Os, Hordaland, she is the older sister of Erik Tysse and is married to former German middle distance runner Stephan Plätzer, who is also her coach. They have two children, Kiara Lea and Sebastian.

Achievements

References

2007 World Championships in Osaka,Japan 20 km 4th place
2008 Olympic Games in Beijing, China 20 km 2nd place

External links
  Kjersti Plätzer website
 
  Kjersti Plätzer retirement feature

1972 births
Living people

Norwegian female racewalkers
Athletes (track and field) at the 2000 Summer Olympics
Athletes (track and field) at the 2004 Summer Olympics
Athletes (track and field) at the 2008 Summer Olympics
Olympic athletes of Norway
Olympic silver medalists for Norway
People from Os, Hordaland
Medalists at the 2008 Summer Olympics
Medalists at the 2000 Summer Olympics
Olympic silver medalists in athletics (track and field)
Sportspeople from Vestland